Doğusandal    (meaning "East sandalwood" named after Santalum album, a common tree") is a village in Erdemli district of Mersin Province, Turkey. At  it is  situated in the lower slopes of the Toros Mountains. The population of Dağusandal  is 264 
 as of 2012.  There are ruins of Byzantine settlements around the village, however the village was founded about four centuries ago. The main agricultural crops grown in the village are citrus, olive and tomato.

References

Villages in Erdemli District